Attalla is a city in Etowah County, Alabama, United States. As of the 2010 census, the population was 6,048.

History 

The town occupies the site of an Indian village which was of considerable importance during the Creek War. It was in Attalla that David Brown, a Cherokee assisted by the Rev. D. S. Butterick, prepared the Cherokee Spelling Book.

Attalla was not founded until 1870, on land donated by W. C. Hammond, a plantation owner. It was incorporated as a city government on February 5, 1872. The town was officially named "Attalla" in 1893, from the Cherokee language word meaning "mountain". Attalla was prosperous until the railroads that it depended on went into bankruptcy.

Attalla is the site of the first hydroelectric dam to provide electricity for a city, constructed in 1887.

20th century to present
William Lewis Moore, a U.S. postman and white civil rights activist, was murdered here on April 23, 1963 as he tried to walk from Chattanooga, Tennessee to Jackson, Mississippi to deliver his letter in support of civil rights to Mississippi Governor Ross Barnett. The suspected murderer, Floyd Simpson, was never charged with the crime.

Geography 
Attalla is in Etowah County at  (34.009818, -86.098413). It is bordered to the east by the city of Gadsden, the county seat, and at its southernmost point by Rainbow City.

Interstate 59 runs along the eastern edge of the city, with access from Exits 181 and 183. U.S. Route 11 passes through the center of town as Third Street and runs generally parallel to I-59, leading northeast  to Fort Payne and southwest  to Birmingham. U.S. Routes 278 and 431 also pass through the center of Attalla, leading east  to downtown Gadsden. US 431 runs north  to Albertville, while US 278 leads west  to Cullman. Alabama State Route 77 passes through the southern section of Attalla, leading north  to US 431 and southeast  to Rainbow City.

Big Wills Creek, a tributary of the Coosa River, flows southeasterly through the city. The southern end of Lookout Mountain rises to the east overlooking the city.

Demographics

City of Attalla

2000 Census data
At the 2000 census there were 6,795 people, 2,672 households, and 1,976 families living in the city. The racial makeup of the city was 78.42% White, 13.5% Black or African American, 1.5% Native American, 0.08% Asian, 1.64% from other races, and 0.67% from two or more races. 2.22% of the population were Hispanic or Latino of any race.
Of the 2,620 households 30.2% had children under the age of 18 living with them, 47.6% were married couples living together, 16.4% had a female householder with no husband present, and 31.5% were non-families. 29.0% of households were one person and 13.9% were one person aged 65 or older. The average household size was 2.45 and the average family size was 3.00.

The age distribution was 23.7% under the age of 18, 8.9% from 18 to 24, 27.3% from 25 to 44, 22.4% from 45 to 64, and 17.7% 65 or older. The median age was 38 years. For every 100 females, there were 90.2 males. For every 100 females age 18 and over, there were 86.5 males.

The median household income was $27,444 and the median family income  was $39,549. Males had a median income of $30,605 versus $19,693 for females. The per capita income for the city was $15,727. About 16.4% of families and 18.6% of the population were below the poverty line, including 22.5% of those under age 18 and 22.0% of those age 65 or over.

2010 census
At the 2010 census there were 6,048 people, 2,442 households, and 1,627 families living in the city. The racial makeup of the city was 81.5% White, 12.7% Black or African American, .4% Native American, 0.5% Asian, 2.9% from other races, and 2.0% from two or more races. 4.7% of the population were Hispanic or Latino of any race.
Of the 2,442 households 27.0% had children under the age of 18 living with them, 42.5% were married couples living together, 18.1% had a female householder with no husband present, and 33.4% were non-families. 29.8% of households were one person and 13.0% were one person aged 65 or older. The average household size was 2.41 and the average family size was 2.07.

The age distribution was 22.7% under the age of 18, 8.9% from 18 to 24, 25.0% from 25 to 44, 26.3% from 45 to 64, and 17.2% 65 or older. The median age was 39.8 years. For every 100 females, there were 89.3 males. For every 100 females age 18 and over, there were 94.9 males.

The median household income was $32,426 and the median family income  was $35,934. Males had a median income of $33,428 versus $25,441 for females. The per capita income for the city was $16,457. About 13.9% of families and 18.2% of the population were below the poverty line, including 27.5% of those under age 18 and 13.9% of those age 65 or over.

2020 census

As of the 2020 United States census, there were 5,827 people, 2,151 households, and 1,364 families residing in the city.

Attalla Precinct/Division (1880-1970)

The Attalla Beat (Etowah County 17th Beat) first appeared on the 1880 U.S. Census. In 1890, "beat" was changed to "precinct." In 1960, the precinct was changed to "census division" as part of a general reorganization of counties. In 1980, Attalla census division was consolidated with Gadsden census division.

Education 
The Attalla City School System is the public school district. As of 2006 it has some 1,823 students.

The district includes the following schools:
 Attalla Elementary School (Grades Pk-5)
 Etowah Middle School (Grades 6–8)
 Etowah High School (Grades 9-12)

The system formerly had Alma Hinson Junior High School. In 1962 the editor of The Etowah News Journal described the school as having a "nothing short of excellent" curricula and "a bright exception" to problems in other schools in the system.

Notable people
Gerald William Barrax (1933–2019), poet and educator
Betty Kelly (born September 16, 1944), member of Motown girl group Martha and the Vandellas
Larry Means (born April 20, 1947), former member of the Alabama Senate and current mayor
Patrick Nix (born April 7, 1972), former Auburn University quarterback
Tyrone Nix (born September 30, 1972), defensive coordinator for the Ole Miss Rebels
B. L. Noojin (1885–1950), athlete, educator, and politician
Albert Staton (1899–1980), basketball and football player for Georgia Institute of Technology

Photo Gallery

References

Notes

References

External links
City of Attalla official website

Alabama placenames of Native American origin
Cities in Alabama
Cities in Etowah County, Alabama
Populated places established in 1870
U.S. Route 11
1870 establishments in Alabama